Before Night Falls  is a 2000 American biographical drama directed by Julian Schnabel. The film is based on both the autobiography of the same name by Reinaldo Arenas—published in English in 1993—as well as Jana Boková's 1990 documentary Havana.

The screenplay was co-written by Schnabel, Lázaro Gómez Carriles and Cunningham O'Keefe. The film stars Javier Bardem (his international film debut, and who was nominated for the Academy Award for Best Actor), Johnny Depp, Olivier Martinez, Andrea Di Stefano, Santiago Magill and Michael Wincott. The film had its world premiere at the 2000 Venice International Film Festival.

Plot
In the film, Arenas is born in Oriente Province in Cuba in 1943 and raised by his single mother and her parents, who soon move the entire family to Holguín. After moving to Havana in the 1960s to continue his studies, Reinaldo begins to explore his ambitions, as well as his sexuality. After receiving an honorary mention in a writing contest, Arenas is offered the chance to publish his first work. Through his work and friendships with other openly gay men (such as Pepe Malas and Tomas Diego), Arenas manages to find himself.

The political climate in Cuba becomes increasingly dangerous, and in the early 1970s Arenas is arrested for allegedly sexually assaulting minors, and for publishing abroad without official consent. In the next decade, he is in and out of prison, attempting and failing to leave the country several times.

In 1980, Arenas finally leaves Cuba for the United States, starting a new life with his close friend Lazaro Gomez Carriles. A few years later, Arenas is diagnosed with AIDS, and after spending several years suffering he dies in 1990.

Cast
 Javier Bardem as Reinaldo Arenas
 Olivier Martinez as Lázaro Gómez Carriles
 Johnny Depp as Bon Bon / Lt. Víctor
 Héctor Babenco as Virgilio Piñera
 Andrea Di Stefano as Pepe Malas
 Santiago Magill as Tomás Diego
 John Ortiz as Juan Abreu
 Manuel González as José Lezama Lima
 Francisco Gattorno as Jorge Camacho
 Marisol Padilla Sánchez as Margarita Camacho
 Michael Wincott as Herberto Zorilla Ochoa
 Pedro Armendáriz Jr. as Reinaldo's Grandfather
 Sean Penn as Cuco Sanchez
 Najwa Nimri as Fina Zorilla Ochoa
 Diego Luna as Carlos
 Cy and Olmo Schnabel as Reinaldo's classmates
 Vito Maria Schnabel as Teenage Reinaldo
 Lola Schnabel as Girl with keys
 Stella Schnabel as Valeria
 Jack and Esther G. Schnabel as Mr. and Mrs. Greenberg
 Olatz López Garmendia as Mrs. Arenas

Production
Julian Schnabel got the idea of making Before Night Falls immediately after making Basquiat; however, it took four years to actually produce the film.

Bardem spent one-and-a-half months in New York City with Arenas's best friend, Lazaro Gomez Carriles, taking two hours a day to study how Arenas walked and talked.

Reception

Critical response
On review aggregator website Rotten Tomatoes, the film has a 73% approval rating based on 98 reviews and an average rating of 6.8/10. The site's consensus states: "An impressionistic, fragmented look at Reinaldo Arenas, Before Night Falls imagery manages to evoke a sense of the writer's artistry, and Bardem's strong performance holds the film together. Finally, a biopic done well." Metacritic reports an 85 out of 100 rating based on 26 critics, indicating "universal acclaim".

Roger Ebert gave the film 3.5 stars out of 4, stating, "One is reminded a little of the Marquis de Sade, as portrayed in Quills. It was never simply what they wrote, but that, standing outside convention, taunting the authorities, inhabiting impossible lives, they wrote at all." Peter Travers from Rolling Stone awarded the film a full five out of five stars, writing, "In uniting to honor Arenas, Bardem and Schnabel create something extraordinary."

Box office
The film opened in eight venues on December 22, 2000, and earned $85,230 in its first weekend, ranking #34 in the North American box office. The film received a wide release on February 23, 2001.

Before Night Falls grossed $4.2 million in the US and $4.3 million overseas for a worldwide total of $8.5 million from an estimated $20 million budget.

Accolades

Notes

References

External links
 
 
 
 
 

2000 films
2000 romantic drama films
2000 LGBT-related films
2000 biographical drama films
American biographical drama films
American independent films
American LGBT-related films
American romantic drama films
French-language American films
2000s Russian-language films
Spanish-language American films
Biographical films about writers
Films based on autobiographies
Films set in Cuba
Films set in New York (state)
Films set in the 1950s
Films set in the 1960s
Films set in the 1970s
Films set in the 1980s
Films shot in Mexico
Films shot in New York (state)
Venice Grand Jury Prize winners
Films scored by Carter Burwell
Films directed by Julian Schnabel
Gay-related films
Biographical films about poets
2000 independent films
Films produced by Jon Kilik
2000s English-language films
2000s American films